Perymenium acuminatum is a species of flowering plant in the tribe Heliantheae within the family Asteraceae. It is found in Mexico.

References 

 Revision of Perymenium (Aseraceae-Heliantheae) in Mexico and Central America. John J. Fay, Allertonia, Vol. 1, No. 4 (January 1978), pages 235-296 (jstor Stable URL)

External links 
 
 Perymenium acuminatum at Tropicos
 Holotype of Calea elegans DC. at JStor Global Plants

Heliantheae
Plants described in 1924
Flora of Mexico